Juggling world records comprise the best performances in the fields of endurance and numbers juggling.

Criteria 
For ratification as a world record, the claimed record 
 must be proved by video evidence, either available to the general public or 
 must be validated by organizations such as Guinness World Records

Up until 2012 any record must have been proved by either of the two methods above or by video evidence, available to the members of the former Juggling Information Service Committee on Numbers Juggling (JISCON). JISCON is no longer active.

Records begin where each object being juggled has been thrown and successfully caught at least once (e.g. 11 catches of 12 balls is not listed). This is known as a 'flash'. Where each object is thrown and caught more than once the term used is a 'qualify'.

Notes on defining the props 
 Balls, which include beanbags, must be roughly spherical objects.
 Clubs, which include sticks and batons, must be long, roughly cylindrical objects.
 Rings, which include plates and hoops, must be flat, roughly circular objects.
 Bouncing balls must be bounced off a solid, flat, horizontal surface with just one bounce per ball between each throw and catch.

Solo juggling records 
Props must be thrown individually from each hand, and counting of catches commences once all props bar one have been thrown. 
Multiplexing (throwing more than one prop at a time from the same hand) is not allowed. 
Catches are counted only for throws made while no props have been dropped. According to JISCON definition, a drop is "a failure to catch an object that, as a result, hits the ground or any foreign object. A drop is considered to have happened at the moment the object should have been caught or touched, not when it hits the ground."

Balls

Clubs

Rings

Bouncing 
Force Bounce

Lift Bounce

Passing records 

When passing, only the props thrown between two separate jugglers are counted. In some patterns (ultimates or one-count) all the throws are caught by the opposite juggler but in other patterns each juggler makes some throws to themselves. The reason for excluding self throws is that two jugglers could make a single pass to their partner and then go on to juggle solo patterns for as long as they wanted therefore undermining the record for 'passing'.

Balls

Clubs

Rings

Notes

References

External links
JISCON the Juggling Information Service Committee on Numbers Juggling

Juggling
Sports records and statistics
Sports world records